Mercs Lake is a lake located on Vancouver Island north of Great Central Lake.

See also
List of lakes of British Columbia

References

Alberni Valley
Lakes of Vancouver Island
Clayoquot Land District